Zupče is a small village located in Zubin Potok in northern Kosovo.

History
During World War II, Zupče was among the villages in North Kosovo that was burned down by Albanian paramilitaries and the Serb population expelled.

Notes and references
Notes

References

Villages in Zubin Potok